Conus velaensis is a species of sea snail, a marine gastropod mollusk in the family Conidae, the cone snails and their allies.

Like all species within the genus Conus, these snails are predatory and venomous. They are capable of "stinging" humans, therefore live ones should be handled carefully or not at all.

Distribution
This species occurs in the Caribbean Sea off Colombia

Description 
The maximum recorded shell length is 31 mm.

Habitat 
Minimum recorded depth is 35 m. Maximum recorded depth is 35 m.

References

 Petuch, E. J., 1992. Molluscan Discoveries from the Tropical Western Atlantic Region (ii). La Conchiglia: International Shell Magazine, 24 (265 ): 10 -15
 Tucker J.K. & Tenorio M.J. (2009) Systematic classification of Recent and fossil conoidean gastropods. Hackenheim: Conchbooks. 296 pp.

External links
 The Conus Biodiversity website
 

velaensis
Gastropods described in 1993